Chulkovo may refer to the following localities in Russia:

 Chulkovo, Nizhny Novgorod Oblast
 Chulkovo, Oryol Oblast
 Chulkovo, Krasnoyarsk Krai
 Chulkovo, Leningrad Oblast
 
 Chulkovo, Omsk Oblast
 Chulkovo (village), Vladimir Oblast
 Chulkovo (settlement), Vladimir Oblast
 Chulkovo, Vologda Oblast